Old Dispensary or the Old Dispensary may refer to:
Old Dispensary (Zanzibar)
Old Dispensary (London), a historic building in Stratford, London